La Esperanza Airport  is an airport serving the Escondido River village of La Esperanza in the South Caribbean Coast Autonomous Region of Nicaragua. The airport is east of the village, on the opposite side of the river.

See also

 List of airports in Nicaragua
 Transport in Nicaragua

References

External links
 OpenStreetMap - La Esperanza
 OurAirports - La Esperanza
 FallingRain - La Esperanza

Airports in Nicaragua